Guangjiao Temple is a Buddhist temple located on the top of Mount Lang, in Nantong, Jiangsu, China. The temple is dedicated to Mahasthamaprapta Bodhisattva.

History
Guangjiao Temple was first built by Sengjia in 669, under the Tang dynasty (618–907). At that time, it initially called "Cihang Temple" The name was changed into "Guangjiao Temple" in 958, during the Five Dynasties and Ten Kingdoms (907–960). During the Taiping Xingguo period (976–983) of the Song dynasty (960–1279), Zhihuan settled at Guangjiao Temple, where he disseminated Buddhism.

After the 3rd Plenary Session of the 11th Central Committee of the Chinese Communist Party in 1980, local government restored and redecorated the temple.  Guangjiao Temple has been classified as a National Key Buddhist Temple in Han Chinese Area by the State Council of China in 1983.

Architecture
The existing main buildings include the Yuantong Hall, Grand Buddha Hall, Hall of Great Campassion, Hall of Four Heavenly Kings, Buddhist Texts Library, abbot's room, monk's dwellings and a pagoda named "Zhiyuan".

Yuantong Hall
The Yuantong Hall enshrining statues of the Three Sages of the West, namely Guanyin, Amitabha and Mahasthamaprapta.

Grand Buddha Hall
The Grand Buddha Hall is three rooms wide and three rooms deep. It still preserves the architectural style of the Ming dynasty (1368–1644). Statue of Sakyamuni is enshrined in the middle of the hall. Inner walls are painted with frescos.

Zhiyun Pagoda
The Zhiyun Pagoda was first built between 976 and 984 in the Song dynasty (960–1279). The  pagoda has the brick and wood structure with five stories and four sides. Curved bars and cornices are set on each story, which are magnificent and become the symbol of Guangjiao Temple.

References

Buddhist temples in Nantong
Buildings and structures in Nantong
Tourist attractions in Nantong
20th-century establishments in China
20th-century Buddhist temples
Religious buildings and structures completed in the 1980s